Sudler's Conclusion is a historic home located at Manokin, Somerset County, Maryland. It is a two-part house consisting of a -story, early-18th-century Flemish bond brick section with a frame two-story west wing erected about 1840.  Also on the property is a log smokehouse, frame tobacco barn, and a small private cemetery.

It was listed on the National Register of Historic Places in 1973.

References

External links
, including photo from 1984, at Maryland Historical Trust
Historic American Buildings Survey (HABS) documentation, filed under Route 361 vicinity, northwest of Manokin, Manokin, Somerset County, MD:

Houses in Somerset County, Maryland
Houses on the National Register of Historic Places in Maryland
Queen Anne architecture in Maryland
Historic American Buildings Survey in Maryland
National Register of Historic Places in Somerset County, Maryland